The Apple Music Festival (formerly known as the iTunes Festival) was a concert series held by Apple, Inc. and inaugurated in 2007. Free tickets were given to Apple Music, iTunes and DICE users who lived in the United Kingdom, through localized prize draws. Performances were streamed live and available to view afterwards, free of charge, for Apple Music members on their Apple TV, iPhone, iPad, iPod touch, Mac, PC, and Android phones. In London, the Apple Music Festival became an annual event taking place (from 2009) in September at the Roundhouse arts centre in Camden Town. The series made its United States debut with five days of free performances at the Moody Theater in March 2014, alongside the South by Southwest (SXSW) music showcase in Austin, Texas.

In August 2015, the iTunes Festival was renamed as the Apple Music Festival. In 2017, after a 10-year run, Apple confirmed to Music Business Worldwide that it would no longer host any music festivals.

2007
Held at the Institute of Contemporary Arts.

 Mika
 Travis
 Groove Armada
 Kasabian (EP)
 Stereophonics
 The Maccabees
 Athlete
 Amy Winehouse
 Ludovico Einaudi
 Crowded House
 Jamie Woon
 Beverly Knight
 Paolo Nutini
 Editors
 The Pigeon Detectives
 Scott Matthews
 Imogen Heap
 Jack Peñate
 David Ford
 Black Rebel Motorcycle Club
 Athlete
 Ben's Brother
 Elisa
 The Hoosiers
 Cherry Ghost
 Remi Nicole
 The Coral
 The Go! Team
 Air Traffic
 Nine Black Alps
 Just Jack
 Terra Naomi
 Raul Midón
 Kano
 The Bumble Strips
 Aqualung
 Mutya Buena
 Beverly Knight
 GoodBooks
 Leon Jean-Marie
 Wir sind Helden
 Jamie Scott & The Town
 Tiny Dancers
 Goldspot
 The Bad Plus
 Leash

2008
Held at KOKO, Camden Town.

 July 1: N*E*R*D + Kenna + Chester French
 July 2: Paul Weller + Glasvegas
 July 3: Hadouken! + Does It Offend You, Yeah?
 July 4: The Feeling + Gabriella Cilmi
 July 5: Roots Manuva + Sway
 July 6: Elliot Minor (EP) + Kids In Glass Houses
 July 7: The Black Kids + Foals
 July 8: Lightspeed Champion + Pete & The Pirates
 July 9: The Ting Tings + Florence & The Machine
 July 10: Jamie Lidell + Yelle + Laura Izibor
 July 11: The Script + Sam Beeton
 July 12: James Blunt + Beth Rowley
 July 13: John Legend
 July 14: Death Cab For Cutie + I Was A Cub Scout
 July 15: The Zutons (EP) + Red Light Company
 July 16: CSS + Alphabeat
 July 17: Guillemots + Lykke Li
 July 18: The Music + XXT
 July 19: Feeder (EP) + Infadels
 July 20: Neil Cowley Trio + Portico Quartet
 July 21: Sam Sparro + Annie
 July 22: Suzanne Vega + Seth Lakeman
 July 23: The Script + Sam Beeton
 July 24: McFly
 July 25: Taio Cruz + Jay Sean
 July 26: Chaka Khan ** cancelled **
 July 27: Royworld + Tom Baxter
 July 28: Pendulum + INME
 July 29: The Ahn Trio + Hayley Westenra
 July 30: The Pretenders + Gemma Hayes

2009
Held at The Roundhouse, Camden Town.

 July 1: Jamie T + Slow Club
 July 2: Fightstar + Young Guns
 July 3: Jack Penate + Golden Silvers
 July 4: Flo Rida + Ironik
 July 5: Snow Patrol (EP) + Silversun Pickups + Animal Kingdom
 July 6: Franz Ferdinand + Passion Pit
 July 7: Mr Hudson w/ Kanye West + Kid Cudi + Kid British
 July 8: David Guetta w/ Kelly Rowland
 July 10: Paolo Nutini + Marina and the Diamonds
 July 11: La Roux + Dan Black
 July 12: Stephen Fry + Mumford & Sons (EP) + The Temper Trap
 July 13: Newton Faulkner + Raygun
 July 14: Placebo (album) + General Fiasco (EP)
 July 15: Friendly Fires + Magistrates
 July 16: Simple Minds
 July 17: Noisettes + Skint & Demoralised
 July 18: Calvin Harris + Miike Snow
 July 19: Bat for Lashes
 July 20: Bloc Party + Delphic + The Invisible
 July 21: Oasis + The Enemy
 July 22: Kasabian (EP) + Twisted Wheel
 July 23: Graham Coxon + Esser
 July 24: a-ha + Reamonn
 July 25:
 July 26: Madeleine Peyroux + Imelda May
 July 27: The Saturdays + Sophie Ellis-Bextor + Girls Can't Catch
 July 28: Amadou and Mariam + Charlie Winston
 July 29: Simian Mobile Disco + Gold Panda
 July 30: The Hoosiers + Steve Appleton
 July 31: MIKA + Erik Hassle

2010
Held at The Roundhouse, Camden Town and live streamed on MySpace.com

 July 1: Scissor Sisters (EP) + The Drums
 July 2: Tony Bennett + Antonia Bennett
 July 3: Ozzy Osbourne (EP) + The Sword (EP) + Black Spiders
 July 4: Foals + Two Door Cinema Club
 July 5: N-Dubz + Example
 July 6: Kate Nash + Peggy Sue
 July 7: Paloma Faith (EP) + Alan Pownall
 July 8: Ellie Goulding (EP) + Delta Maid
 July 9: Mumford & Sons + Laura Marling + The Dharohar Project
 July 10: The National + Stornoway
 July 11: Keane + We Are Scientists
 July 12: The XX + Wild Beasts
 July 13: Florence + The Machine (EP) + Lauren Pritchard
 July 14: Faithless + Chew Lips
 July 15: Rolando Villazón + Milos Karadaglic
 July 16: Amy Macdonald + Tiffany Page
 July 17: Underworld + Kele
 July 18: Bombay Bicycle Club + Stephen Fry + Everything Everything
 July 19: The Futureheads + Frank Turner
 July 20: Pixie Lott + Rachel Furner
 July 21: The Courteeners + Chapel Club + The Cheek
 July 22: Goldfrapp + Marina and the Diamonds
 July 23: Defected In The House live
 July 25: Foreigner + Europe
 July 26: Plan B + Tinie Tempah
 July 27: Chipmunk + Daisy Dares You
 July 28: Scouting For Girls + Diana Vickers (EP)
 July 29: The Hoosiers + Diagram of the Heart
 July 30: Phoenix + James Yuill
 July 31: Biffy Clyro + Pulled Apart By Horses

2011
Held at The Roundhouse, Camden Town and broadcast by ITV2 and presented by Alexa Chung and Dave Berry.

 July 1: Paul Simon
 July 2: Seasick Steve + Smoke Fairies
 July 3: Manic Street Preachers + Dry The River + Ramona + Ukulele for Dummies
 July 4: Linkin Park (EP) + Neon Trees
 July 5: Beady Eye + Steve Cradock + Gwyneth Paltrow
 July 6: Arctic Monkeys (EP) + Miles Kane
 July 7: Adele (EP) + Michael Kiwanuka
 July 8: Bruno Mars + Ed Sheeran
 July 9: My Chemical Romance (EP) + Evaline
 July 10: Glasvegas + Cat's Eyes + Beatsteaks
 July 11: Foo Fighters + Jimmy Eat World (EP)
 July 12: The Script + Loick Essien
 July 13: White Lies + The Naked and Famous + Alice Gold
 July 14: Friendly Fires + SBTRKT
 July 15: Hard-Fi + David Nicholls
 July 16: The Wombats + All The Young
 July 17: Raphael Saadiq + Bluey Robinson + Selah Sue + Medi
 July 18: Rumer + Caitlin Rose + Mark Radcliffe
 July 19: Katy B + Jamie Woon
 July 20: The Wanted + Dionne Bromfield + Encore
 July 21: Swedish House Mafia + Alex Metric
 July 22: Coldplay (EP) + The Pierces
 July 23: Mogwai + Errors
 July 24: Noah and the Whale + Fixers
 July 25: Lang Lang + 2CELLOS
 July 26: Magnetic Man + Alex Clare
 July 27: Example + Wretch 32 + Yasmin
 July 28: Chase & Status + Nero
 July 29: Kasabian (EP) + PENGu!NS
 July 30: James Morrison + Benjamin Francis Leftwich
 July 31: Moby + Silver Apples

2012
Held at The Roundhouse, Camden Town and broadcast across Channel 4's stations (including Channel 4, T4 and E4).

 September 1: Usher + Miguel
 September 2: Ed Sheeran + Charli XCX + Rudimental
 September 3: Olly Murs + The Milk
 September 4: Plan B + Delilah + Ryan Keen
 September 5: Emeli Sandé + Bastille + Gabrielle Aplin
 September 6: JLS + Conor Maynard
 September 7: Elbow + Bat for Lashes
 September 8: Jack White + Band of Horses
 September 9: deadmau5 + Foreign Beggars
 September 10: Norah Jones + Beth Orton
 September 11: The Killers + Jake Bugg
 September 12: Noel Gallagher's High Flying Birds + The Soundtrack of Our Lives
 September 13: P!nk + Walk the Moon
 September 14: Labrinth (EP) + Josh Kumra
 September 15: David Guetta + Calvin Harris
 September 16: Rebecca Ferguson (EP) + Laura Mvula
 September 17: Example + DJ Fresh + Hadouken!
 September 18: Andrea Bocelli (EP) + Laura Wright + CARisMA
 September 19: Matchbox Twenty + OneRepublic
 September 20: One Direction (EP) + Angel
 September 21: Jessie J + Lonsdale Boys Club
 September 22: Biffy Clyro + Frightened Rabbit
 September 23: Robert Glasper + José James
 September 24: Mumford & Sons + Willy Mason
 September 25: Lana Del Rey + Benjamin Francis Leftwich
 September 26: Ellie Goulding + Haim (EP)
 September 27: Madness + Reverend and The Makers
 September 28: Alicia Keys + Lianne La Havas
 September 29: Hot Chip + Kindness
 September 30: Muse + Natalie Duncan

2013
Held at The Roundhouse, Camden Town.

 September 1: Lady Gaga + DJ White Shadow
 September 2: Sigur Rós + Poliça
 September 3: The Lumineers + PHOX
 September 4: Paramore + Fenech-Soler
 September 5: Rizzle Kicks + Eliza Doolittle
 September 6: Queens of the Stone Age + Palma Violets
 September 7: Phoenix + Little Green Cars (Canceled because Phoenix's singer, Thomas Mars, was ill)
 September 8: Bastille + The 1975
 September 9: Arctic Monkeys + Drenge
 September 10: Jake Bugg + Valerie June
 September 11: Kings of Leon + Jimmy Eat World
 September 12: Elton John + Tom Odell
 September 13: Avicii + Henrik B
 September 14: Chic + Janelle Monáe
 September 15: Vampire Weekend + The Olms
 September 16: Jack Johnson + Bahamas
 September 17: Ludovico Einaudi + Agnes Obel
 September 18: Thirty Seconds to Mars + The Family Rain
 September 19: Kendrick Lamar + Schoolboy Q
 September 20: Primal Scream + Skinny Girl Diet
 September 21: HAIM + Gabrielle Aplin + Bipolar Sunshine + Dan Croll
 September 22: Ellie Goulding + Laura Welsh
 September 23: Jessie J + Lawson
 September 24: Robin Thicke + Aloe Blacc
 September 25: Pixies + NO CEREMONY///
 September 26: Tinie Tempah + Naughty Boy
 September 27: Dizzee Rascal + Katy B
 September 28: John Legend + Tamar Braxton
 September 29: Justin Timberlake + Mikky Ekko
 September 30: Katy Perry + Iggy Azalea + Icona Pop

2014

Austin
On February 19, 2014, Apple announced that the iTunes Festival would take place in the U.S. for the first time with a five-day festival at the Moody Theater, Austin, Texas from March 11–15, alongside South by Southwest.
 March 11: Coldplay + Imagine Dragons + London Grammar
 March 12: Kendrick Lamar + ScHoolboy Q + Isaiah Rashad
 March 13: Soundgarden + Band of Skulls + Capital Cities
 March 14: Pitbull + Zedd + G.R.L.
 March 15: Keith Urban + Willie Nelson + Mickey Guyton

London
On 21 July 2014, Apple announced some of the line up for the eighth iTunes Festival held at The Roundhouse, Camden Town

 September 1: deadmau5 + Friend Within
 September 2: Beck + Jenny Lewis
 September 3: David Guetta + Clean Bandit + Robin Schulz
 September 4: 5 Seconds of Summer + Charlie Simpson
 September 5: Kasabian
 September 6: Tony Bennett + Imelda May
 September 7: Calvin Harris + Kiesza
 September 8: Robert Plant + Luke Sital-Singh
 September 9: Sam Smith + SOHN
 September 10: Pharrell Williams + Jungle
 September 11: Maroon 5 + Matthew Koma + Nick Gardner
 September 12: Elbow + Nick Mulvey
 September 13: Paolo Nutini + Rae Morris
 September 14: David Gray + Lisa Hannigan
 September 15: The Script + Foxes
 September 16: Blondie + Chrissie Hynde
 September 17: Gregory Porter + Eric Whitacre
 September 18: Jessie Ware + Little Dragon
 September 19: SBTRKT + Jamie xx
 September 20: Rudimental + Jess Glynne
 September 21: Ryan Adams + First Aid Kit
 September 22: Jessie J + James Bay 
 September 23: Placebo + The Mirror Trap
 September 24: Ben Howard + Hozier
 September 25: Mary J. Blige + Gorgon City
 September 26: Lenny Kravitz + Wolf Alice
 September 27: Kylie Minogue + MNEK
 September 28: Nicola Benedetti + Miloš + Alison Balsom
 September 29: Ed Sheeran + Foy Vance
 September 30: Plácido Domingo + Khatia Buniatishvili

2015
On 18 August 2015, Apple announced some of the 2015 line up and confirmed that the festival had been rebranded as the Apple Music Festival. Held at The Roundhouse, Camden Town, the festival was broadcast via Apple Music.

 September 19: Ellie Goulding + Andra Day
 September 20: Take That + Charlie Puth
 September 21: Carrie Underwood + The Shires + Cam
 September 22: One Direction + Little Mix
 September 23: The Weeknd + Grace Mitchell + Justine Skye
 September 24: The Chemical Brothers + Hudson Mohawke
 September 25: Disclosure + NAO + Lion Babe
 September 26: Pharrell Williams + Leon Bridges
 September 27: Mumford & Sons + Jack Garratt
 September 28: Florence + The Machine + James Bay

2016 
In 2016 the Apple Music Festival 10 returned to The Roundhouse, Camden Town for its tenth year. The full line up was announced on 25 August 2016 via Beats1 by Julia Adenuga as a surprise during Chart with Brooke Reese. The festival was streamed live and on-demand via Apple Music.  Beats1 also broadcast live interviews and performances from the festival. The festival was heavily promoted with artwork, pictures and videos on Apple Music's Instagram and Snapchat stories. Festival performers such as Britney Spears personally messaged UK fans via Twitter for exclusive free tickets to the artist's respective performances at the festival.
 September 18: Elton John
 September 19: The 1975 + Christine And The Queens
 September 20: Alicia Keys + Jordan Fisher
 September 21: OneRepublic + Passenger
 September 23: Calvin Harris + Disciples + John Newman
 September 25: Robbie Williams
 September 26: Bastille
 September 27: Britney Spears
 September 28: Michael Bublé
 September 30: Chance The Rapper

Cancellation 
In early September 2017, Apple announced that it would not be continuing the Apple Music Festival.

References

External links

 – official site

Music festivals in London
Music festivals in Texas
ITunes
Apple Inc. services
Music festivals established in 2007
Music festivals disestablished in 2016